This is the list of the 9 members of the European Parliament for Latvia in the 2004 to 2009 session.

List

Party representation

Notes

Latvia
2004
List